Douglas Hugh Osborne (born 19 July 1952) was a rugby union player who represented Australia.

Osborne, a wing, was born in Thames and claimed a total of 3 international rugby caps for Australia.

References

Australian rugby union players
Australia international rugby union players
1952 births
Living people
Rugby union wings
Rugby union players from Waikato